Melissa Murray could refer to: 

Melissa Murray (playwright) (born 1954), British dramatist and poet
Melissa Murray (politician) (born 1974), member of the Rhode Island Senate
Melissa Murray (academic) (born 1975), American legal scholar